William Gérald Accambray (born 8 April 1988) is a French handball player who plays for Pays d'Aix UC and for the French national team.

With the French national team, he won the World Championship in 2011.

He is the son of hammer thrower Jacques Accambray and Isabelle Accambray.

Achievements
Olympic Games:
Winner: 2012
World Championship:
Winner: 2011, 2015
European Championship:
Winner: 2014
LNH Division 1:
Winner: 2006, 2008, 2009, 2010, 2011, 2012
Coupe de France:
Winner: 2006, 2008, 2009, 2010, 2012

References

External links
Profile at Montpellier Agglomération Handball official website

1988 births
Living people
Sportspeople from Cannes
French male handball players
Handball players at the 2012 Summer Olympics
Olympic handball players of France
Olympic gold medalists for France
Olympic medalists in handball
Medalists at the 2012 Summer Olympics
European champions for France
Expatriate handball players
French expatriate sportspeople in Hungary
French expatriate sportspeople in Slovenia
Competitors at the 2009 Mediterranean Games
Mediterranean Games silver medalists for France
Mediterranean Games medalists in handball
21st-century French people